Orešje nad Sevnico is a settlement in the hills north of Sevnica in central Slovenia. The area is part of the traditional region of Styria. The municipality is now included in the Lower Sava Statistical Region.

Name
The name of the settlement was changed from Orešje to Orešje nad Sevnico in 1953.

References

External links
Orešje nad Sevnico at Geopedia

Populated places in the Municipality of Sevnica